The geographically extreme points of the Republic of Turkey are:

Northernmost:  The point is on the Turkish-Bulgarian border in Kofçaz, Kırklareli Province –
Southernmost: The spring of Kale Stream, Yayladağı, Hatay Province –
Westernmost: Cape Avlaka, Gökçeada(İmbros Island), Çanakkale –
Easternmost: Dilucu Bordergate, Aralık/Iğdır –
Center (according to the rectangle made by the parallels and meridians that pass through the most eastern, western, northern and southern points): Point near Yukarıhasinli Village and Karakimse Village, Kocasinan, Kayseri –

Note: Westernmost point connected to land is Cape Baba/Ayvacık/Çanakkale and the northernmost point connected to land is İnceburun itself. Cape Baba is also the westernmost point of Asian mainland. The southernmost point of Anatolia is Cape Anamur, Anamur, Mersin.

City Centers 
 Northernmost: Sinop
 Southernmost: Antakya
 Westernmost: Çanakkale
 Easternmost: Iğdır

Towns (>2000) 
 Northernmost: Sinop (for "not a city", it's Doğanyurt/Kastamonu)
 Southernmost: Yayladağı/Hatay Province
 Westernmost: Gökçeada (İmroz)/Çanakkale
 Easternmost: Aralık/Iğdır

Villages 
 Northernmost: Ahlatlı/Kofçaz/Kırklareli
 Southernmost: Topraktutan/Yayladağı/Hatay Province
 Westernmost: Uğurlu/Gökçeada (İmroz)/Çanakkale
 Easternmost: Alan/Şemdinli/Hakkari

Altitude 
 Highest: Mount Ararat (Ağrı), Iğdır — 
 Lowest: An unnamed place near Akyatan Lagoon, Mediterranean Sea, Adana —

See also
Extreme points of Earth
Geography of Turkey

References

Turkey geography-related lists
Turkey